Shetland is a Scottish crime drama series made by ITV Studios for BBC Scotland and first broadcast on BBC One on 10 March 2013.  Based upon the novels of Ann Cleeves and adapted for television by David Kane, who has remained a principal writer throughout, it stars Douglas Henshall as DI Jimmy Pérez.  Also starring are Alison O'Donnell as DS Alison "Tosh" McIntosh, Steven Robertson as DC Sandy Wilson and Mark Bonnar as Duncan Hunter. Lewis Howden, Erin Armstrong, Julie Graham and Anne Kidd are also principal members of the cast. Henshall won the 2016 BAFTA Scotland award for best actor and the series received the award for Best TV Drama. From Series 8 (2023), Ashley Jensen stars as DI Ruth Calder, replacing Henshall.

The stories take place largely on the eponymous archipelago, although some of the filming takes place on the Scottish mainland.  Most, but not all, exterior location filming takes place in Shetland; in 2021, filming of series 6 and 7 took place in Shetland in two segments, each of about six weeks’ duration. Interiors may be filmed in either Shetland or in west central Scotland.

On 2 December 2019, BBC One announced that two further series were intended for 2020 and 2021 with Henshall and O’Donnell returning in their roles. Production had to be postponed due to COVID-19. Series 6 broadcast began on 20 October 2021 and series 7 on 10 August 2022.

On 20 July 2022, it was announced that Shetland would return in 2023 for an eighth series, however without Henshall.

Production
The first series consists of two episodes, a single two-part story based on the novel Red Bones  by Ann Cleeves. This series was broadcast across two nights on 10 and 11 March 2013 and was produced by Sue de Beauvoir. Subsequently, a second series was commissioned by the BBC. Series two was extended to contain six episodes. These were filmed in 2013 and screened in 2014. This series features three two-part stories based on Cleeves' novels Raven Black, Dead Water, and Blue Lightning. This series was produced by Peter Gallagher.

Filming began in April 2015 for a third series, which began screening in January 2016. This series saw a change in format; with all six episodes covering a single story, written exclusively for television.  This was the first series not to adapt any of Cleeves' novels. Ciarán Hinds and Anna Chancellor were among the new cast members for this series. A fourth series was announced by the BBC in July 2016. Again, this series is a single story played out across six episodes and written exclusively for television. Stephen Walters and Neve McIntosh were among the new cast members announced for the series. It was broadcast on BBC One beginning on 13 February 2018. Series 5 was broadcast on BBC1 from 12 February 2019.

During filming, the cast and crew are usually based in Glasgow and other areas of mainland Scotland. Filming often takes place in areas with landscape or buildings reminiscent of those in the Shetland Islands, such as Kilbarchan in Renfrewshire, Barrhead, where Henshall was born and grew up, Ayr and Irvine, North Ayrshire. "My character’s house is actually in Kilbarchan, the interior of a couple of crofts are here [in Irvine, Ayrshire] and the police station is in Barrhead", Henshall said in a 2019 interview.

Filming locations on or near Shetland have included Lerwick, the NorthLink ferry and the village of Wester Quarff, south of Lerwick. Some filming was on Fair Isle for series 2. The Hillswick wildlife sanctuary featured in series 4.

Shortly before series 7 premiered, Henshall announced that the series would be his last. He was replaced by Ashley Jensen from Series 8 onwards.

Cast

Main cast

 Douglas Henshall as Jimmy Pérez, detective inspector (series 1–7)
 Alison O'Donnell as Alison "Tosh" McIntosh, detective sergeant (series 1–)
 Steven Robertson as Sandy Wilson, detective constable (series 1–)
 Mark Bonnar as Duncan Hunter, Cassie's biological father (series 1–)
 Julie Graham as Rhona Kelly, procurator fiscal (series 2–5, 7–)
 Lewis Howden as Billy McCabe, police sergeant (series 1, 3–7-)
 Erin Armstrong as Cassie Pérez, Jimmy's stepdaughter (series 1–7)
 Anne Kidd as Cora McLean, forensic pathologist (series 5–, recurring series 2–4)
 Anneika Rose as Maggie Kean, procurator fiscal (series 6-7)
 Lucianne McEvoy as Meg Pattison (series 6–7)
 Ashley Jensen as Ruth Calder, detective inspector (series 8–)

Recurring cast
 Stewart Porter as Billy McBride, police sergeant (series 2; temporarily replacing Lewis Howden)
 Fiona Bell as Donna Killick (series 4, 6)
 Neve McIntosh as Kate Kilmuir (series 4, 6)
 Julia Brown as Molly Kilmuir (series 4, 6)
 Jimmy Chisholm as Alec MacBay (series 4, 6)
 Conor McCarry as PC Alex Grant (series 5–7)
 Angus Miller as Donnie (series 5–7)

Series 1
Red Bones
Sandra Voe as Mima Wilson
Claire Rafferty as Anna Haldane
Jim Sturgeon as Ronald Haldane
Gemma Chan as Hattie James
Geraldine Alexander as Gwen James
Lindy Whiteford as Jackie Haldane
James Greene as Andrew Haldane
Martin Wenner as Professor Paul Berglund
Alexander Morton as Joseph Wilson
Sophie Rundle as Sophie
Sooz Aitken as Young Mima Wilson

Series 2

Raven Black
Rebecca Benson as Sally Henry
Brian Cox as Magnus Bain
Sophia Carr-Gomm as Catherine Ross
Chris Reilly as Alan Isbister
Cara Kelly as Margaret Henry
Frances Grey as Jess Collins
Freya Monk as Kitty Collins
Matthew Zajac as Alex Henry
Anthony Flanagan as Euan Ross
Tunji Kasim as Hugo Scott
Jana Reinermann as Gret Bruce
Jordan Young as Brian Bruce

Dead Water
Nina Sosanya as Willow Reeves
Alex Norton as Cameron Watt
David Hayman as Joe Dalhousie
Kari Corbett as Evie Watt
Marnie Baxter as Jenny Belshaw
Iain Robertson as Jerry Markham
Clive Russell as Adam Markham
Gerda Stevenson as Maria Markham
Neil McKinven as Andy Belshaw
Forbes Masson as Reg Gilbert
Henry Pettigrew as Iain Redford
Steven Cree as John Henderson
Leanne Best as Annabel

Blue Lightning
John Lynch as Frank Blake
Bill Paterson as James Pérez
Leigh Biagi as Anna Blake
Anthony Howell as Peter Latimer
David Ireland as Finlay Caulfield
Julie Hale as Tessa Warren
Keith Ramsey as Joe Blake
Annie Louise Ross as Mary Pérez
Susan Vidler as Isobel Tulloch
Lorne MacFadyen as Angus Tulloch
Michael Nardone as Donnie Tulloch
David Annen as Bill Warren
Paksie Vernon as Gina Bradley

Series 3
Ciarán Hinds as Michael Maguire
Saskia Reeves as Freya Galdie
Sara Vickers as Leanne Randall
Andrew Rothney as Robbie Morton
Archie Panjabi as DS Asha Israni
Anna Chancellor as Phyllis Brenan
James Cosmo as Arthur MacCall
Jamie Michie as Lowrie
Jack Greenlees as Craig Cooper
Kate Donnelly as Grace
Mark Cox as Tommy Monro
Struan Rodger as Alec
Ace Bhatti as Calvin Sarwar
Jack Greenlees as Craig Cooper
Benjamin Cawley as Edison

Series 4
 Stephen Walters as Thomas Malone
 Sean McGinley as Drew McColl
 Amy Lennox as Sally McColl
 Sophie Stone as Jo Halley
 Gerard Miller as Alan Killick
 Allison McKenzie as Gail Callahan
 Arnmundur Ernst Björnsson as DS Lars Bleymann
 Carolin Stoltz as DI Anke Strom
 Eleanor Matsuura as DI Jessie Cole
 Joi Johannsson as Andreas Hagan
 Hannah Donaldson as Meg Hamilton
 Michael Moreland as Benny Ray
  Eldar Skar as NDA leader

Series 5
 Rakie Ayola as Olivia Lennox
 Derek Riddell as Chris Brooks
 Catherine Walker as Alice Brooks
 Tracy Wiles as Carla Hayes
 Owen Whitelaw as Prentice Hayes
 Lorn Macdonald as Jamie Hayes
 Ryan Fletcher as Calum Dunwoody
 John Kazek as Paul Kiernan
 Meghan Tyler as Mags
 Ayanda Bhebe as Daniel Ugara
 Robin Laing as Gavin Laird
 Gail Watson as Mary Hunter
 Frances Mayil McCann as Niki
 Emma Mullen as Rosie
 Titana Muthui as Zezi Ugara
 Kirsty Stuart as Morag Dunwoody
 Kate Dickie as Sam Boyd
 Jenni Keenan-Green as Claire McGuire
 Therese Bradley as Andrea Doyle
 Robert Cavanah as Graeme Benson

Series 6
   
 Cora Bissett as Eve Galbraith
 Shona McHugh as Merran Galbraith
 Stephen McCole as Logan Creggan
 Kate Bracken as Lynda Morton	
 Thoren Ferguson as Eamon Gauldie
 Andy Clark as Mick Muir
 Lewis Gribben as Fraser Creggan
 Sharif Dorani as Nazir Nassan
 Julie-Yara Atz as Salma Nassan
 Helene Maksoud as Rasha Nassan
 Shonagh Price as Sister Carolyn/Lyn Harrison
Benny Young as James Pérez
 Alec Newman as Niven Guthrie
 Jim Sturgeon as Alex Galbraith

Series 7

 Shauna Macdonald as Rachel Cairns
 Andrew Whipp as Danny Cairns
 Patrick Robinson as Lloyd Anderson
 Laurie Brett as Alison Woods
 Stuart McQuarrie as Murry Rankin
 Alexandra Finnie as Clana

Episodes

Overview

Series 1 (2013)

Series 2 (2014)

Series 3 (2016)
The broadcast of Episode 6 was delayed due to coverage of an FA Cup replay being broadcast. In contrast to Season 2 (3, 2-part episodes), Season 3 is one 6-part story.

Series 4 (2018)
The broadcast of Episode 3 was delayed by 24 hours due to the broadcast of an FA Cup replay.

Series 5 (2019)

Series 6 (2021)

Series 7 (2022)

Home media

Released on DVD in Australia, Shetland, Series 1 consists of the pilot "Red Bones" and the Series 2 episodes "Raven Black", "Dead Water" and "Blue Lightning". Series 2 contains the Series 3 episodes, Series 3 contains the Series 4 episodes, and Series 4 contains the Season 5 episodes.

On Australian Region 4 DVD, The Pilot episode is stated as being Pilot and not Series 1, with the Series 2 episodes being stated as Series 1. Quote from the DVD "This DVD set includes the Pilot Red Bones and all episodes from series one Raven Black, Dead Water and Blue Lightning". However, the UK releases are Series 1 through 7 rather than Series 1 through 6 in Australia.

International broadcasts
 Australia: The programme airs on BBC First and ABC in Australia. Series 1-4 is also available on Netflix (Series 1 and 2 are combined and listed as Series 1, then Series 3 and 4 are listed as Series 2 and 3 respectively).
 Belgium: The programme began airing on Flemish public broadcaster VRT's main channel, één, in October 2015.
 Canada: The series is broadcast on British Columbia's Knowledge Network and streamed on Netflix.
 Denmark: Danish network DR 1 began showing Shetland in October 2015.
 Germany: The series began airing on Das Erste at the end of March 2016.
 Estonia: The series began airing on ETV in September 2020.
 Finland: Viewers in Finland were able to start watching the show from August 2015 on public broadcaster YLE's main TV1 channel, where the show was titled "."
 Ireland: The series began airing on Virgin Media in February 2019
 Italy: The series began airing on Giallo in March 2018.
 Japan: The series began airing on AXN Mystery in May 2015.
 Netherlands: Shetland is aired as part of the "Detectives" series from KRO-NCRV on NPO 1.
 New Zealand: The programme began airing in New Zealand on Vibe in January 2016.
 Norway: Shetland is aired on public broadcaster NRK.
 Portugal: The programme began airing in Portugal on Fox Crime in August 2016.
 Spain: The programme began airing in Galicia on Televisión de Galicia in October 2015.
 Slovenia: The programme began airing in Slovenia on public broadcaster RTVSLO in July 2015.
 Sweden: Swedish public broadcaster SVT started airing the 3rd series in January 2016 on their primary network SVT1.
 United States: The series is broadcast on many stations of the Public Broadcasting System.
The series became available on Netflix in 2016. In 2018, the Britbox streaming service acquired the exclusive rights to Shetland's Series 4, releasing new episodes weekly. Similarly, Series 5 has been released one episode per week beginning 30 April 2019. In April 2019, Netflix dropped the series from its streaming service in the US. Amazon has Series 1-3 available for fee purchase by episode or by season but is not included in its Prime streaming subscription. (Note that Series 1 [2 episodes] and Series 2 [6 episodes] are bundled into one season for purchase.)

Accolades

References

External links

2013 Scottish television series debuts
2010s British crime drama television series
2010s British mystery television series
2010s British police procedural television series
2010s British workplace drama television series
2010s Scottish television series
2020s British crime drama television series
2020s British mystery television series
2020s British police procedural television series
2020s British workplace drama television series
2020s Scottish television series
BBC crime drama television shows
BBC mystery television shows
BBC Scotland television shows
British detective television series
English-language television shows
Television series by ITV Studios
Television shows set in Scotland
Mass media in Shetland